Specimen may refer to:

Science and technology
 Sample (material), a limited quantity of something which is intended to be similar to and represent a larger amount
 Biological specimen or biospecimen, an organic specimen held by a biorepository for research
 Laboratory specimen, a biological specimen taken by sampling
 Zoological specimen, an animal or part of an animal preserved for scientific use
 Herbarium, a collection of preserved plant specimens for scientific study
 Type specimen (mineralogy), a reference sample by which a mineral is defined

Printing
 Specimen banknote, to aid in the recognition of banknotes
 Specimen stamp, used to identify valid stamps

Other uses
 Specimen (band), a 1980s British band
 Specimen Products, a Chicago-based audio equipment manufacturer
 Specimen Ridge, a ridge in Yellowstone National Park, Wyoming, US
 Specimen (film), a 1996 film starring Mark-Paul Gosselaar